The Australian College of Ministries (ACOM) is an interdenominational Evangelical theological institute (75% owned by Churches of Christ in NSW/ACT and 25% owned by the Christian and Missionary Alliance) based in Rhodes, New South Wales, Sydney, Australia. It is a member institution of the Sydney College of Divinity.

History 
The college was formed as the result of the 1999 merger of Kenmore College (Queensland) and the Churches of Christ Theological College (New South Wales).

In 2017, the Christian & Missionary Alliance of Australia and its Alliance Institute for Mission became a member of the college. 

In January 2023, Stirling Theological College discontinued its accreditation with the University of Divinity and effectively merged operations with Australian College of Ministries.  Stirling's assets are managed by its existing board and its name lives on in the new ACOM 'Stirling School of Community Care' with awards in Christian Counselling, Professional Supervision and Chaplaincy.

Programs
In its five schools (Bible, theology, leadership, spirituality and the Stirling School of Community Care), ACOM employs a faculty with a focus on leadership, teaching, counselling and pastoral supervision.

Beliefs 
The College is owned by the Christian & Missionary Alliance of Australia and Churches of Christ in Australia NSW/ACT.

Notable alumni 
 Graham Joseph Hill.

References

Further reading
 Dowson, (eds.), Research on sociocultural influences on motivation and learning, Vol. 7: Standards in education, Greenwich, CT: Information Age Publishing.

External links
 website

Educational institutions established in 1999
Seminaries and theological colleges in New South Wales
Universities and colleges affiliated with the Churches of Christ
Evangelical seminaries and theological colleges in Australia colleges]]
1999 establishments in Australia